Vena Cava is a live performance album by avant-garde artist Diamanda Galás. It was released in 1993 on Mute Records.

Track listing

Personnel
Diamanda Galás – vocals
Philip-Dimitri Galás – accordion, vocals
Production and additional personnel
Blaise Dupuy – engineering
Eric Liljestrand – production
Robbie Lorenço – photography
Fred Sodima – art direction

Release history

References

External links 
 

Diamanda Galás albums
1993 live albums
Mute Records live albums